John Anthony Bellairs (January 17, 1938 – March 8, 1991) was an American author best known for his fantasy novel The Face in the Frost and many Gothic mystery novels for children featuring the characters Lewis Barnavelt, Rose Rita Pottinger, Johnny Dixon, and Anthony Monday. Most of his books were illustrated by Edward Gorey. Thirteen unfinished and original sequels to Bellairs' books have been written by Brad Strickland. At the time of his death, Bellairs' books had sold a quarter-million copies in hard cover and more than a million and a half copies in paperback.

Biography

Early life and education 
Bellairs was born in Marshall, Michigan, the son of Virginia (Monk) and Frank Edward Bellairs, a saloonkeeper. His hometown inspired the fictional town of New Zebedee, where he set his trilogy about Lewis Barnavelt and Rose Rita Pottinger. Shy, overweight, and often bullied as a child, he became a voracious reader and a self-described "bottomless pit of useless information" by the time he graduated from Marshall High School and entered the University of Notre Dame in 1955. He competed in the College Bowl and wrote a regular humor column for the student magazine Scholastic.

Bellairs received a Bachelor of Arts degree in English magna cum laude from the University of Notre Dame in 1959 and a Master of Arts degree in English from the University of Chicago in 1960. He received a Woodrow Wilson Fellowship in 1959.

Career and interests 
Bellairs taught English at the College of Saint Teresa (1963–65), Shimer College (1966–67), Emmanuel College (1968–69), and Merrimack College (1969–71) before turning full-time to writing in 1971. In the late 1960s, he spent six months living and writing in Bristol, UK, where he began writing The Face in the Frost. Bristol would later feature in his novel The Secret of the Underground Room. His personal interests included archaeology, architecture, history, Latin, baseball, kitschy antiques, bad poetry, visits to the UK, and trivia of all kinds. His favorite authors included Charles Dickens, Henry James,  M.R. James, Garrett Mattingly, and C.V. Wedgwood.

Alongside Christopher Tolkien, Bellairs was a guest of honor at the 18th Annual Mythopoeic Conference at Marquette University in 1987, hosted by the Mythopoeic Society.

Death and legacy 
Bellairs died suddenly of cardiovascular disease at his home in Haverhill, Massachusetts, in 1991. He was 53 years old. He was survived by his wife, Priscilla (Braids) Bellairs, whom he had married on June 24, 1968, and their son Frank J. Bellairs. Frank Bellairs died in 1999 at the age of 29. Priscilla Bellairs is alive and lives in Newburyport.

In 1992, a historical marker was placed in front of the historic Cronin House in Bellairs's hometown of Marshall, Michigan. Built in 1870 for local merchant Jeremiah Cronin, this imposing Italianate mansion with its 60-foot tower had inspired the titular house of his 1973 book.

Bellairs was inducted into the Haverhill Citizens Hall of Fame in 2000.

Writings

Books for adults 
Bellairs' first published work, St. Fidgeta and Other Parodies (1966), is a collection of short stories satirizing the rites and rituals of Second Vatican Council-era Catholicism. The title story of St. Fidgeta grew out of humorous stories Bellairs made up and shared with friends while living in Chicago. After committing one such story to paper, he sent it to the Chicago-based Catholic magazine The Critic, which published the story in summer 1965. The following year, the hagiography of St. Fidgeta was supplemented by eleven other humorous stories, including an essay on lesser-known popes of antiquity, a cathedral constructed over the course of centuries, and a spoof letter from a modern-day Xavier Rynne about the escapades at the fictional Third Vatican Council. Library Journal hailed St. Fidgeta as "religious burlesque" that delivered "strokes of inspired foolishness." A writer for the National Catholic Reporter called it a "gem."

The Pedant and the Shuffly, his second book, is a short illustrated fable featuring the evil magician Snodrog (the titular pedant), who ensnares his victims with inescapable (and nonsensical) logic until the kindly sorcerer, Sir Bertram Crabtree-Gore, enlists the help of a magical Shuffly to defeat Snodrog. The book was originally published in 1968 and rereleased in 2001 and 2009.

Bellairs undertook his third book, The Face in the Frost (1969), while living in Britain and after reading J.R.R. Tolkien's The Lord of the Rings. Bellairs said of his third book: "The Face in the Frost was an attempt to write in the Tolkien manner. I was much taken by The Lord of the Rings and wanted to do a modest work on those lines. In reading the latter book I was struck by the fact that Gandalf was not much of a person—just a good guy. So I gave Prospero, my wizard, most of my phobias and crotchets. It was simply meant as entertainment and any profundity will have to be read in." Writing in 1973, Lin Carter described The Face in the Frost as one of the three best fantasy novels to appear since The Lord of the Rings. Carter stated that Bellairs was planning a sequel to The Face in the Frost at the time. An unfinished sequel titled The Dolphin Cross was included in the anthology Magic Mirrors (New England Science Fiction Association Press, 2009).

Books for children 
Bellairs's next novel, The House with a Clock in Its Walls (1973), was originally written as a contemporary adult fantasy. To improve the novel's marketability, his publisher suggested rewriting it as a young readers' book. The result was The House with a Clock in Its Walls, which was named as one of The New York Times Outstanding Books of 1973 and nominated for other awards.

Following the success of The House with a Clock in Its Walls, Bellairs focused on writing Gothic fantasy adventures aimed at elementary and middle-school children. "I write scary thrillers for kids because I have the imagination of a 10-year-old," remarked Bellairs. "I love haunted houses, ghosts, witches, mummies, incantations, secret rituals performed by the light of the waning moon, coffins, bones, cemeteries and enchanted objects." Bellairs also wrote his hometown influenced his creative bent: “In my imagination I repeatedly walk up and down the streets of the beautiful old Michigan town where I grew up. It’s full of old Victorian mansions and history, and it would work on the creative mind of any kid.”

Writing for The New York Times, Marilyn Stasio characterized Bellairs' children's books as fast-paced, spooky adventures involving "believable and likeable" characters, generally a child and an older person (usually a "lovable eccentric") who are friends and must go on adventures and solve a mystery involving supernatural elements such as ghosts and wicked sorcerers. Beyond these supernatural elements, Bellairs's novels evoked "a child's concern with comfort and security in his real world," addressing childhood fears of abandonment, loneliness, and bullying, as well as coming of age. His stories are described as spooky but ultimately reassuring as the characters conquer evil through friendship.

The books have proved especially popular among middle-grade readers between the ages of 9 and 13 but also have significant young adult and adult readerships.

Posthumous sequels

On his death in 1991, Bellairs left behind two unfinished manuscripts and two one-page synopses for future adventures. The Bellairs estate commissioned Brad Strickland to complete the two unfinished manuscripts and to write novels based on the two one-page outlines. These became The Ghost in the Mirror; The Vengeance of the Witch-finder; The Drum, the Doll, and the Zombie; and The Doom of the Haunted Opera, respectively. Starting in 1996 with The Hand of the Necromancer, Strickland began writing his own stories based on the established characters.

Strickland announced in spring 2005 that new adventures of the Bellairs characters were under way, following contract negotiations with the Bellairs estate and a two-year absence since his last-published novel. The first of these new adventures was The House Where Nobody Lived, which was published on October 5, 2006.

Critical analysis 
Critical attention has focused on The House With the Clock in Its Walls as exemplar of Bellairs' literary merit and style. Critics argued that Bellairs wrestled with notions of masculinity, femininity, and queerness in his works. One scholar contended that Bellairs' Lewis Barnavelt and Rose Rita Pottinger trilogy traced the "emerging acceptance of self" by the two main characters, who struggled with internalized gender norms. One of the most substantial academic treatments of Bellairs comes from Dawn Heinecken, professor of women's and gender studies at the University of Louisville. Heinecken situates Bellairs in 1970s-era anxieties about gender and changing discourses around masculinity, which were reflected in the era's children's literature.

Conservative critic William Kilpatrick observed of Bellairs that "While his books are quite frightening, they are well written and undergirded by a moral vision" and recommended them to parents who wish to expose their children to age-appropriate literature that both entertains and edifies. Randi Dickson suggested that Bellairs' oeuvre evidenced greater literary merit than the works of R. L. Stine, whose horror fiction appeals to a youthful demographic similar to Bellairs'. Educators have used The House With the Clock in Its Walls as a case study for using storytelling techniques to draw in reluctant readers or assigning The Curse of the Blue Figurine to students in a book club.

Bellairs' books have been translated into Czech, French, German, Japanese, Polish, and Spanish, among other languages.

Illustrators
Edward Gorey provided cover illustrations and frontispieces for all but three of Bellairs's 15 children's novels and continued to illustrate the Strickland novels until Gorey's death in 2000. The novel The Beast Under the Wizard's Bridge featured Gorey's last published artwork before his death. Despite the strong association of the novels with Gorey's illustrations, Bellairs and Gorey never met and probably never even corresponded. The Gorey covers are no longer in print, though some newer editions of the novels still contain interior Gorey illustrations.

S. D. Schindler and Bart Goldman have created cover art for the Strickland books published since 2001.

Marilyn Fitschen provided the covers and illustrations for Bellairs' first three books: St Fidgeta and Other Parodies, The Pedant and the Shuffly, and The Face in the Frost.

Awards

Published books

Novels

  Some Lewis Barnavelt and Johnny Dixon books were outlined by Bellairs and completed by Strickland, who subsequently created new stories in both series.

Publishers

Adaptations

Films 
On November 18, 2011, Mythology Entertainment, founded by Brad Fischer, co-president of production at Phoenix Pictures; Laeta Kalogridis; and James Vanderbilt announced that they hired Eric Kripke, creator of Supernatural and Revolution, to write and produce a feature film based on John Bellairs' work through a partnership with John's estate. "Jamie, Laeta and I are thrilled to launch Mythology Entertainment and to be partnering with Eric Kripke and the estate of John Bellairs for our first feature project,” Fischer said.“As a kid, Eric was inspired by Bellairs’ work and these books have stayed with him through the years…. As a company, we aspire to be a haven for artists and friends who believe in the power of myth and remember that feeling we all got as kids, when the lights went down and the images came up and anything was possible.”

The film adaptation of Bellairs' novel The House with a Clock in Its Walls stars Jack Black as Uncle Jonathan, Cate Blanchett as Mrs. Zimmerman, and Owen Vaccaro as Lewis Barnavelt, and was directed by Eli Roth. It was released on September 21, 2018.

Audiobooks

As of September 2022, Blackstone Publishing has re-issued Face In the Frost and all 12 Lewis Barnavelt books on CD and digital formats. Beginning in May 2022 and continuing until mid-2023, Blackstone commissioned audiobooks of the Johnny Dixon books, read by Johnny Heller.

Television

See also

 Lewis Barnavelt (series)
 Johnny Dixon (series)
 Anthony Monday (series)
 List of horror fiction authors

References

External links
 Bellairsia | blog | forum – celebrating John Bellairs
 

 
John Bellairs Papers at the University of Minnesota Libraries

1938 births
1991 deaths
People from Marshall, Michigan
Notre Dame College of Arts and Letters alumni
University of Chicago alumni
20th-century American novelists
Novelists from Illinois
20th-century American male writers
American fantasy writers
Merrimack College faculty
Shimer College faculty
American male novelists
Writers of Gothic fiction
American children's writers
American young adult novelists
Novelists from Massachusetts
Deaths from cardiovascular disease